The Frances Packing House in Orange County, California near Irvine, California is a historic packing house that was built in 1916.  It was listed on the National Register of Historic Places (NRHP) in 1977.

The packing house closed in 1971, and the building was demolished in 1977. One wall of the building was saved and is now part of a bank in the Walnut Shopping Center.

See also
Elephant Packing House, also NRHP-listed in Orange County

References

Packing houses
Buildings and structures in Orange County, California
National Register of Historic Places in Orange County, California
Demolished buildings and structures in California
Industrial buildings completed in 1916
Buildings and structures demolished in 1977
1916 establishments in California
1977 disestablishments in California